Saint John the Dwarf (Greek: Ἰωάννης Κολοβός; Arabic: ابو يحنّس القصير (Abū) Yuḥannis al-Qaṣīr c. 339 – c. 405), also called Saint John Colobus, Saint John Kolobos or Abba John the Dwarf, was a Coptic Desert Father of the early Christian church.

Life
John the Dwarf was born in the town of Thebes in Egypt to poor Christian parents. At the age of eighteen, he and an elder brother, moved to the desert of Scetes where he became a disciple of Saint Pambo and a good friend of Saint Pishoy. He lived a life of austerity and taught several other monks his way of life, among them was Arsenius the Great.

After the departure of Saint Pambo, John was ordained a priest by Pope Theophilus and became abbot of the monastery he founded around the Tree of Obedience. When the Mazices invaded Scetes in 395, John fled the Nitrian Desert and went to live on Mount Colzim, near the present city of Suez, where he died.

In 515, the relics of Saint John the Dwarf were moved to the Nitrian Desert. His feast is celebrated on October 17 in the Roman Catholic Church, on 20 Paopi at the Coptic Orthodox Church and on November 9 in the Eastern Orthodox Church. The Monastery of Saint John the Dwarf in Scetes is now recognized by the Coptic orthodox church.

John lived on only flatbread and vegetables his entire life and could eat one meal a day.

Legend
John the Dwarf is best known for his obedience. The most famous story about his obedience is that one day Saint Pambo gave Abba John a piece of dry wood and ordered him to plant and water it. John obeyed and went on watering it twice a day even though the water was about 12 miles from where they lived. After three years, the piece of wood sprouted and grew into a fruitful tree. Pambo took some of this tree's fruits and went around to all the elder monks, saying "take, eat from the fruit of obedience". Postumian, who was in Egypt in 402, assured that he was shown this tree which grew in the yard of the monastery and which he saw covered with shoots and green leaves.

Ababius, a monk of Scetes and a saint of the Coptic Church, is the subject of a long biography attributed in manuscript form to John the Dwarf. The manuscript has yet to be translated into English.

References

Sources
Saint John the Dwarf
Orthodox Church of America, Feasts and Saints
 Atiya, Aziz S. The Coptic Encyclopedia. New York: Macmillan Publishing Co., 1991.

Further reading

339 births
405 deaths
5th-century Christian saints
Desert Fathers
Egyptian Christian monks
People with dwarfism
Saints from Roman Egypt